Gadore is a town and union council of Bela Tehsil, Lasbela District, Balochistan, Pakistan. It is located at 26°10'50N 66°19'55E with an altitude of 52 metres (173 feet).

References

Union councils of Lasbela District
Populated places in Lasbela District